Worthington Lakes is a series of three reservoirs in Lancashire (from south to north: Worthington, Arley and Adlington) close to nearby Standish, off the A5106 Wigan to Chorley road in the north-west of England. They were constructed in the early 1860s to provide the clean water required by the rapidly growing town of Wigan.

Despite being situated in the Douglas Valley the water supply comes from the Parbold hills to the west as River Douglas was considered too polluted to be used for drinking water. The lakes, which are now in the ownership of United Utilities are today part of a  country park, with a nature reserve and accessible footpaths and used for informal recreation and for angling.

A transcript of the public information notice board provided by United Utilities reads:

References

External links
 Wigan Council- Green Heart

Reservoirs in Greater Manchester